Eight Girls in a Boat is a 1934 American Pre-Code drama film directed by Richard Wallace and written by Helmut Brandis, Lewis R. Foster and Casey Robinson. It is a remake of the 1932 German film Eight Girls in a Boat, which was also co-written by Brandis.

The film stars Dorothy Wilson, Douglass Montgomery, Kay Johnson, Walter Connolly, Ferike Boros, James Bush and Barbara Barondess. The film was released on January 5, 1934, by Paramount Pictures.

Plot
While attending a girls' school in Switzerland, young Christa Storm discovers she is expecting a baby. Student David wants to marry her, but he is poor and Christa's father objects to him as a suitable spouse. Christa contemplates suicide by poison and even enjoys a final night out with friends before having a change of heart.

Others from the rowing team, including the coach, are unaware of Christa's plight. To punish her, the coach at one point makes Christa do strenuous dives and strokes in the water until she nearly collapses. All turns out well for her in the end.

Cast

References

External links
 

1934 films
American drama films
1934 drama films
Paramount Pictures films
Films directed by Richard Wallace
American remakes of German films
Rowing films
Films about women's sports
American black-and-white films
1930s English-language films
1930s American films